Vice President's House (IAST: Upa-Rashtrapati Bhavan) is the official residence of the  Vice President of India, located on Maulana Azad Road in New Delhi, India.

History
From May 1962, the bungalow serves as official residence of Vice President of India, located on No. 6, Maulana Azad Road, New Delhi. It shares a common boundary wall with the Vigyan Bhavan Annexe on the west and is bounded by Maulana Azad Road in the south, Man Singh Road in the east and the green area abutting Rajpath.

See also
 List of official residences of India

External links

References

Official residences in India
Government buildings in Delhi
Vice presidents of India